The 5th European Athletics U23 Championships were held in Erfurt, Germany, at Steigerwaldstadion between 14–17 July 2005.

Complete results and medal winners were published.

Men's Results

Women's

Medal table

Participation
According to an unofficial count, 748 athletes from 41 countries participated in the event.

 (1)
 (1)
 (5)
 (2)
 (31)
 (18)
 (2)
 (7)
 (3)
 (4)
 (15)
 (2)
 (14)
 (16)
 (70)
 (77)
 (48)
 (22)
 (18)
 (1)
 (11)
 (2)
 (45)
 (11)
 (14)
 (2)
 (2)
 (19)
 (3)
 (76)
 (4)
 (16)
 (56)
 (6)
 (8)
 (5)
 (39)
 (20)
 (13)
 (10)
 (29)

Notes and references

 Results at site European Athletics (Men)(Women)
 Official site

 
European Athletics U23 Championships
E
Sport in Erfurt
International athletics competitions hosted by Germany
2005 in youth sport
European Athletics U23
2000s in Thuringia